Ashmunella is a genus of small, air-breathing, land snails in the family Polygyridae.

Species
The following species are recognised in the genus Ashmunella:

Ashmunella altissima 
Ashmunella amblya  – Pine Springs woodland snail   
Ashmunella angulata  – angulate woodland snail  
Ashmunella animasensis  – Animas Peak woodland snail  
Ashmunella ashmuni  – Jemez woodland snail  
Ashmunella auriculata  – Boulder Canyon woodland snail   
Ashmunella bequaerti  – Goat Cave woodland snail
Ashmunella binneyi  – Silver Creek woodland snail  
Ashmunella carlsbadensis  – Guadalupe woodland snail  
Ashmunella chiricahuana  – Cave Creek woodland snail  
Ashmunella cockerelli  – Black Range woodland snail 
Ashmunella danielsi  – Whitewater Creek woodland snail  
Ashmunella edithae  – McKittrick woodland snail 
Ashmunella esuritor  – barefoot woodland snail 
Ashmunella ferrissi  – Reed's Mountain woodland snail 
Ashmunella harrisi  – Goat Mountain woodland snail 
Ashmunella hawleyi 
Ashmunella intricata 
Ashmunella jamesensis 
Ashmunella juarazensis 
Ashmunella lenticula  – Horseshoe Canyon woodland snail 
Ashmunella lepiderma  – Whitetail woodland snail 
Ashmunella levettei  – Huachuca woodland snail  
Ashmunella macromphala  – Cook's Peak woodland snail  
Ashmunella mearnsii  – big hatchet woodland snail  
Ashmunella mendax  – Iron Creek woodland snail  
Ashmunella meridionalis 
Ashmunella milesi 
Ashmunella miorhyssa 
Ashmunella mogollonensis  – Mogollon woodland snail   
Ashmunella montivaga 
Ashmunella mudgei  – Sawtooth Mountain woodland snail  
Ashmunella nana 
Ashmunella organensis  – Organ Mountain woodland snail   
Ashmunella pasonis  – Franklin Mountain woodland snail  
Ashmunella pilsbryana  – Blue Mountain woodland snail 
Ashmunella proxima  – Chiricahua woodland snail 
Ashmunella pseudodonta  – Capitan woodland snail 
Ashmunella rhyssa  – Sierra Blanca woodland snail  
Ashmunella rileyensis  – Mount Riley woodland snail 
Ashmunella ruidosana 
Ashmunella salinasensis  – Salinas Peak woodland snail   
Ashmunella sprouli  – Hell's Canyon woodland snail  
Ashmunella tegillum 
Ashmunella tetrodon  – Dry Creek woodland snail  
Ashmunella thomsoniana  – Sangre de Cristo woodland snail  
Ashmunella todseni  – Maple Canyon woodland snail  
Ashmunella townsendi 
Ashmunella tularosana 
Ashmunella varicifera  – Miller Canyon woodland snail   
Ashmunella walkeri  – Florida Mountain woodland snail
Ashmunella watleyi

References

Further reading 
 Pilsbry H. A. (1948). "Inland Mollusks of Northern Mexico. I. The genera Humboldtiana, Sonorella, Oreohelix and Ashmunella". Proceedings of the Academy of Natural Sciences of Philadelphia 100: 185-203.

Polygyridae
Taxonomy articles created by Polbot